The Krasnoyarsk constituency (No.54) is a Russian legislative constituency in Krasnoyarsk Krai. Until 2007 the constituency covered area around Krasnoyarsk in central Krasnoyarsk Krai. The constituency changed significantly in 2015 as it was redistricted to eastern Krasnoyarsk Krai (southern part of Kansk constituency, including Kansk itself) and shedded its parts to Divnogorsk and Central constituencies.

Members elected

Election results

1993

|-
! colspan=2 style="background-color:#E9E9E9;text-align:left;vertical-align:top;" |Candidate
! style="background-color:#E9E9E9;text-align:left;vertical-align:top;" |Party
! style="background-color:#E9E9E9;text-align:right;" |Votes
! style="background-color:#E9E9E9;text-align:right;" |%
|-
|style="background-color:"|
|align=left|Vladimir Tikhonov
|align=left|Independent
|
|20.64%
|-
|style="background-color:#0085BE"|
|align=left|Yury Grudin
|align=left|Choice of Russia
| -
|15.70%
|-
| colspan="5" style="background-color:#E9E9E9;"|
|- style="font-weight:bold"
| colspan="3" style="text-align:left;" | Total
| 
| 100%
|-
| colspan="5" style="background-color:#E9E9E9;"|
|- style="font-weight:bold"
| colspan="4" |Source:
|
|}

1995

|-
! colspan=2 style="background-color:#E9E9E9;text-align:left;vertical-align:top;" |Candidate
! style="background-color:#E9E9E9;text-align:left;vertical-align:top;" |Party
! style="background-color:#E9E9E9;text-align:right;" |Votes
! style="background-color:#E9E9E9;text-align:right;" |%
|-
|style="background-color:#3A46CE"|
|align=left|Vladimir Tetelmin
|align=left|Democratic Choice of Russia – United Democrats
|
|14.36%
|-
|style="background-color:"|
|align=left|Valery Pozdnyakov
|align=left|Our Home – Russia
|
|14.29%
|-
|style="background-color:"|
|align=left|Yury Abakumov
|align=left|Independent
|
|11.29%
|-
|style="background-color:"|
|align=left|Vladimir Ivanov
|align=left|Liberal Democratic Party
|
|8.54%
|-
|style="background-color:"|
|align=left|Igor Smirnov
|align=left|Yabloko
|
|7.71%
|-
|style="background-color:"|
|align=left|Nikolay Pak
|align=left|Independent
|
|7.02%
|-
|style="background-color:"|
|align=left|Vladimir Tikhonov (incumbent)
|align=left|Power to the People
|
|6.92%
|-
|style="background-color:"|
|align=left|Anatoly Tayursky
|align=left|Independent
|
|6.87%
|-
|style="background-color:"|
|align=left|Vladimir Shkutan
|align=left|Independent
|
|6.43%
|-
|style="background-color:"|
|align=left|Aleksandr Puzanov
|align=left|Independent
|
|2.00%
|-
|style="background-color:#000000"|
|colspan=2 |against all
|
|12.87%
|-
| colspan="5" style="background-color:#E9E9E9;"|
|- style="font-weight:bold"
| colspan="3" style="text-align:left;" | Total
| 
| 100%
|-
| colspan="5" style="background-color:#E9E9E9;"|
|- style="font-weight:bold"
| colspan="4" |Source:
|
|}

1999

|-
! colspan=2 style="background-color:#E9E9E9;text-align:left;vertical-align:top;" |Candidate
! style="background-color:#E9E9E9;text-align:left;vertical-align:top;" |Party
! style="background-color:#E9E9E9;text-align:right;" |Votes
! style="background-color:#E9E9E9;text-align:right;" |%
|-
|style="background-color:"|
|align=left|Valery Zubov
|align=left|Independent
|
|33.30%
|-
|style="background-color:"|
|align=left|Yury Abakumov
|align=left|Communist Party
|
|18.63%
|-
|style="background-color:"|
|align=left|Sergey Bykov
|align=left|Independent
|
|13.33%
|-
|style="background-color:"|
|align=left|Sergey Pokidko
|align=left|Independent
|
|7.25%
|-
|style="background-color:"|
|align=left|Vladimir Tetelmin (incumbent)
|align=left|Independent
|
|6.04%
|-
|style="background-color:"|
|align=left|Svetlana Oskina
|align=left|Independent
|
|1.58%
|-
|style="background-color:"|
|align=left|Sergey Vidov
|align=left|Independent
|
|1.43%
|-
|style="background-color:"|
|align=left|Yury Kachayev
|align=left|Russian All-People's Union
|
|1.17%
|-
|style="background-color:"|
|align=left|Oleg Fedorov
|align=left|Independent
|
|0.84%
|-
|style="background-color:"|
|align=left|Andrey Kochenov
|align=left|Independent
|
|0.76%
|-
|style="background-color:#020266"|
|align=left|Aleksandr Puzanov
|align=left|Russian Socialist Party
|
|0.65%
|-
|style="background-color:"|
|align=left|Sergey Nefedov
|align=left|Independent
|
|0.44%
|-
|style="background-color:#000000"|
|colspan=2 |against all
|
|13.16%
|-
| colspan="5" style="background-color:#E9E9E9;"|
|- style="font-weight:bold"
| colspan="3" style="text-align:left;" | Total
| 
| 100%
|-
| colspan="5" style="background-color:#E9E9E9;"|
|- style="font-weight:bold"
| colspan="4" |Source:
|
|}

2003

|-
! colspan=2 style="background-color:#E9E9E9;text-align:left;vertical-align:top;" |Candidate
! style="background-color:#E9E9E9;text-align:left;vertical-align:top;" |Party
! style="background-color:#E9E9E9;text-align:right;" |Votes
! style="background-color:#E9E9E9;text-align:right;" |%
|-
|style="background-color:"|
|align=left|Valery Zubov (incumbent)
|align=left|Independent
|
|40.79%
|-
|style="background-color:"|
|align=left|Marina Dobrovolskaya
|align=left|Independent
|
|29.94%
|-
|style="background-color:"|
|align=left|Vladimir Bedarev
|align=left|Communist Party
|
|7.86%
|-
|style="background-color:"|
|align=left|Artyom Chernykh
|align=left|Liberal Democratic Party
|
|2.12%
|-
|style="background-color:#00A1FF"|
|align=left|Vladimir Germanovich
|align=left|Party of Russia's Rebirth-Russian Party of Life
|
|1.52%
|-
|style="background-color:"|
|align=left|Yelena Martynenko
|align=left|Independent
|
|1.31%
|-
|style="background-color:"|
|align=left|Olga Likhtina
|align=left|Independent
|
|1.16%
|-
|style="background-color:#1042A5"|
|align=left|Sergey Zhabinsky
|align=left|Union of Right Forces
|
|0.95%
|-
|style="background-color:"|
|align=left|Tamara Dobryak
|align=left|Independent
|
|0.79%
|-
|style="background-color:#7C73CC"|
|align=left|Leonid Pankrats
|align=left|Great Russia – Eurasian Union
|
|0.21%
|-
|style="background-color:#000000"|
|colspan=2 |against all
|
|11.83%
|-
| colspan="5" style="background-color:#E9E9E9;"|
|- style="font-weight:bold"
| colspan="3" style="text-align:left;" | Total
| 
| 100%
|-
| colspan="5" style="background-color:#E9E9E9;"|
|- style="font-weight:bold"
| colspan="4" |Source:
|
|}

2016

|-
! colspan=2 style="background-color:#E9E9E9;text-align:left;vertical-align:top;" |Candidate
! style="background-color:#E9E9E9;text-align:left;vertical-align:top;" |Party
! style="background-color:#E9E9E9;text-align:right;" |Votes
! style="background-color:#E9E9E9;text-align:right;" |%
|-
|style="background-color: " |
|align=left|Yury Shvytkin
|align=left|United Russia
|
|44.21%
|-
|style="background-color:"|
|align=left|Sergey Titov
|align=left|Liberal Democratic Party
|
|11.58%
|-
|style="background-color:"|
|align=left|Aleksey Slonov
|align=left|Communist Party
|
|11.45%
|-
|style="background-color:"|
|align=left|Vladimir Vladimirov
|align=left|Patriots of Russia
|
|8.07%
|-
|style="background-color:"|
|align=left|Andrey Zberovsky
|align=left|A Just Russia
|
|5.64%
|-
|style="background:"| 
|align=left|Tatyana Osipova
|align=left|Communists of Russia
|
|5.62%
|-
|style="background-color: "|
|align=left|Aleksandr Gornostayev
|align=left|Rodina
|
|3.08%
|-
|style="background-color: " |
|align=left|Artyom Tarasov
|align=left|Yabloko
|
|2.96%
|-
|style="background-color:"|
|align=left|Sergey Shakhmatov
|align=left|The Greens
|
|1.86%
|-
| colspan="5" style="background-color:#E9E9E9;"|
|- style="font-weight:bold"
| colspan="3" style="text-align:left;" | Total
| 
| 100%
|-
| colspan="5" style="background-color:#E9E9E9;"|
|- style="font-weight:bold"
| colspan="4" |Source:
|
|}

2021

|-
! colspan=2 style="background-color:#E9E9E9;text-align:left;vertical-align:top;" |Candidate
! style="background-color:#E9E9E9;text-align:left;vertical-align:top;" |Party
! style="background-color:#E9E9E9;text-align:right;" |Votes
! style="background-color:#E9E9E9;text-align:right;" |%
|-
|style="background-color: " |
|align=left|Yury Shvytkin (incumbent)
|align=left|United Russia
|
|36.96%
|-
|style="background-color:"|
|align=left|Sergey Natarov
|align=left|Liberal Democratic Party
|
|14.88%
|-
|style="background-color:"|
|align=left|Sergey Tokov
|align=left|Communist Party
|
|13.53%
|-
|style="background:"| 
|align=left|Oleg Kolesnikov
|align=left|Communists of Russia
|
|6.87%
|-
|style="background-color: " |
|align=left|Ivan Korostelev
|align=left|New People
|
|6.81%
|-
|style="background-color:"|
|align=left|Igor Flyagin
|align=left|A Just Russia — For Truth
|
|6.73%
|-
|style="background-color:"|
|align=left|Sergey Shakhmatov
|align=left|The Greens
|
|5.38%
|-
|style="background-color: "|
|align=left|Sergey Buchenik
|align=left|Party of Pensioners
|
|3.45%
|-
| colspan="5" style="background-color:#E9E9E9;"|
|- style="font-weight:bold"
| colspan="3" style="text-align:left;" | Total
| 
| 100%
|-
| colspan="5" style="background-color:#E9E9E9;"|
|- style="font-weight:bold"
| colspan="4" |Source:
|
|}

Notes

References

Russian legislative constituencies
Politics of Krasnoyarsk Krai